KHWL is a radio station airing a red dirt music format licensed to Lone Wolf, Oklahoma, broadcasting on 98.7 MHz FM. The station serves the Altus, Oklahoma area, and is owned by Chad and Shelley Fox, through licensee Fuchs Radio LLC.

History
KHWL was first licensed in 2012 and was owned by Wolfpack Media LLC. It originally aired an active rock format, and was branded "K-HOWL 98.7". The station played hard rock, death metal and an eclectic mix of music enjoyed by very loyal listeners. Effective December 1, 2018, the station was sold to Fuchs Radio for $60,000. Its new owners changed its format to news/talk, as "News Radio 98.7". On June 4, 2020, KHWL switched to a red dirt music format, branded as "98.7 Red Dirt Rebel."

References

External links

Country radio stations in the United States
HWL
Radio stations established in 2012
2012 establishments in Oklahoma